Ixora marquesensis is a species of flowering plant in the family Rubiaceae. It is endemic to Marquesas in French Polynesia, hence its name.

References

External links
World Checklist of Rubiaceae

marquesensis
Flora of French Polynesia
Data deficient plants
Taxonomy articles created by Polbot
Taxa named by Forest B.H. Brown